Heikkinen – Komonen Architects is a Finnish architectural firm established by Mikko Heikkinen and Markku Komonen in Helsinki in 1974. Their work is characterised as a fusion between minimalism, high-technology and Abstract expressionism, typified by their design for the Vuotalo Cultural Centre in Helsinki, or the Heureka Science Centre, in Vantaa with the juxtaposition of stark concrete elements against colourful high-tech metal structures and large glazed surfaces. They have also completed a number of small-scale humanitarian projects for Guinea, west Africa, based on local building traditions.

Main works 
 Heureka Science Centre, Vantaa, Finland (1989)
 Rovaniemi Airport, Rovaniemi, Finland (1992) (Extension, 2000)
 European Film College, Ebeltoft, Denmark (1993)
 Embassy of Finland, Washington, D.C., United States (1994)
 Elementary School, Boundou Koura, Guinea (1997)
 Elementary School, Madina Kouta, Guinea (1997)
 School for Chicken Farmers, Kindia, Guinea (1999)
 Juminkeko, the Information Centre for Kalevala and Karelian Culture, Kuhmo (1999)
 McDonald's Headquarters and restaurant, Pikku Huopalahti, Helsinki (1999)
 Max Planck Institute for Molecular Cell Biology and Genetics, Dresden, Germany (2000)
 Vuotalo Vuosaari Culture Centre, Helsinki, Finland (2000)
 Mediacenter Lume, Aalto University School of Art and Design, Helsinki, Finland (2000)
 Emergency Services College, Kuopio, Finland (1988–2005)
 Laavu prototype house (2007)
 Hämeenlinna Regional Archive, Hämeenlinna, Finland (2010)
 Flooranaukio Housing, Helsinki (2012)

Awards 
 Heinrich Tessenow Medal (2003)
 International Award for Innovative Technology in Architecture, 2nd prize, Venice Biennale, 1990 (Heureka)

References 
 Peter Davey, "Heikkinen & Komonen", Current Architecture Catalogues, Watson-Guptill Publications, 1994. 
 Roger Connah, "The end of Finnish architecture, or Ciao Potemkin", Rakennustieto, Helsinki, 1994
 Douglas E. Graf, "Heureka: Formal Analysis", Datutop 18, Tampere, 1996.
 William Morgan (ed.) plus introduction by Juhani Pallasmaa, "Heikkinen + Komonen", The Monacelli Press, New York, 2000.
 Pentti Kareoja, "Local Identity - Flooranaukio Housing", Architectural Record, March 2013.
 "Mikko Heikkinen and Markku Komonen, interview by Petra Čeferin", il Progetto, 15/2003.
 "Locating Sacredness, interview with Markku Komonen by Ketty Brocca", Laboratorio 09 numero 7, 2009.
 Mikko Heikkinen, "Reindeer Droppings – Random Remarks on Architecture", Arkkitehti 3/2011.
 Kristo Vesikansa, Laavu prefab home, "Refined Primitive Hut", Arkkitehti 5/2007.

Gallery

Notes

External links 
 
 Homepage

Architecture firms of Finland
Organizations established in 1974
Finnish companies established in 1974
Design companies established in 1974